Chinese scholars, thinkers, and policy-makers have debated about democracy, an idea which was first imported by Western colonial powers but which some argue also has connections to classic Chinese thinking. Starting in the mid-eighteenth century, many Chinese argued about how to deal with the ever-encroaching Western culture.  Though Chinese Confucians were initially opposed to Western modes of thinking, it became clear that aspects of the West were appealing.  Industrialization gave the West an economic and military advantage.  The devastating defeats of the First and Second Opium Wars compelled a segment of Chinese politicians and intellectuals to rethink their notion of cultural and political superiority.
Democracy entered the Chinese consciousness because it was the form of government used in the West, potentially responsible for its industrial, economic and military advancements.  A segment of Chinese scholars and politicians became persuaded that democratization and industrialization were imperative for a competitive China. In response, a number of scholars resisted the idea, saying democracy and Westernization had no place in traditional Chinese culture. Liang Shuming's opinion was most popular, holding that democracy and traditional Chinese society were completely incompatible, hence China's only choice was either wholesale Westernization or complete rejection of the West.  The debate centered on the philosophical compatibility of traditional Chinese Confucian beliefs and the technologies of the West.

Optimism versus pessimism
At a fundamental philosophical level, Confucian tradition is contingent upon an idea articulated by Thomas Metzger as epistemological optimism.  This expresses the belief that it is possible to understand the essence of high morality and design policies and laws that reflect that knowledge.  Confucian society seeks to carry out all daily tasks and rituals in pursuit of fulfilling that universal morality.  The modern conception of liberal democracy is grounded in the opposing principle of ideological pessimism.  This denies that such knowledge is possible, thus the theory and practice of liberal democracy does not make rules in the pursuit of high morality.

Traditional Confucian motivations

Social harmony
A primary motivation within traditional Chinese philosophy is to preserve social harmony.  It looks unfavorably upon anyone who attempts to disrupt this placidity.  The election process that takes place in modern liberal democracy directly opposes this ideal.  During election campaigns, the issues most frequently discussed are the ones that are highly charged emotionally and politically.  In contemporary U.S. elections, controversial issues like abortion, gay marriage, military engagement in the Middle East are at the forefront of campaigns.  Chinese Confucians consider these controversial issues to be cleavages within the fabric of social harmony.  Western politicians rely on utilizing these social cleavages to garner support from voters.    In Chinese culture it would be an impropriety for a politician to exploit these social cleavages to achieve the personal goal of getting elected.  Consequently, many of the more traditionalist Chinese people consider the election process of the West and western-influenced democracies to be quite arguably inappropriate as per Chinese culture.

Serve the common good, not the majority
Another motivation in Chinese culture is to benefit the common good.  Modern liberal democracy is based upon the self-interest of each voter.  Voters are encouraged to choose an official that benefits them and promotes their interests.  Elected representatives serve the interests of their individual constituents.  If they do not adequately represent the beliefs of their constituency they will not be re-elected.  Consequently, people of a traditionalist Chinese perspective tend to believe that the collective good of the people is under-represented in a democracy, which instead reflects majoritarianism.

The weight of the Confucian family
Another frequently cited argument against democracy in China relates to the importance of the family.  Familial relationships form the backbone of China's social structure. People are more concerned with their family than with politics. Based on this aspect of Chinese culture, many traditionalist Chinese viewpoints emphasise that in the absence of a strong authoritarian government, Chinese society would disintegrate. Thus in the eyes of many, a democracy would be too weak for Chinese society.

Christian origins of modern liberal democracy

Universal humanity and individuality
As per some points of view, there is arguably a correlation between Christianity and democracy, perhaps, as per some Chinese perspectives, liberal democracy has its historical basis in Christian culture.  As a result, most current forms contain philosophical remnants of those probable origins.  One such trace of Christianity is the empowerment of the individual.  Christian concepts consider each individual to be sacred in the eyes of God.  The concept of liberal democracy rests on all this sense that the individual has inherent worth regardless of his place within social hierarchies.

Traditional Chinese culture makes no such claim.  In fact, the philosophical significance of the individual is often identified as an area of incompatibility between democracy and Chinese culture.  Confucian societies are centered on familial relationships; an individual had no authority to revolt against these societal ties.  An individual disconnected from the family is widely considered an outcast and relegated to the bottom of the social ladder.  Confucianism lacks a universal reverence for the individual; personal status in Confucian communities is inexorably linked to one's position within the social hierarchy. In this context, many individual rights cannot exist in the same way they do in the West.  Naturally the right of the individual to partake in the direct appointment of a ruling official is an ideological inconsistency with traditional Confucian society.

Evolving debate: from philosophical to Chinese pragmatism

Disassociation of democracy and well-being
A counterpoint to these examples is that as time has progressed, anti-democratic rhetoric has moved away from the philosophical and into the pragmatic. The boom of the Four Tigers and other growing Asian economies has severed the links between Western culture and material wealth in the eyes of many Chinese. In the early 1900s, scholars like Liang Qichao conflated democracy and power. For some Chinese, the economic success of Confucian and authoritarian societies challenges the idea that wholesale adoption of Western beliefs such as Democracy are requisite for economic success.

Proposal for a Confucian society
Some argue a weakening grasp of the People's Republic of China. It is argued that drastic political changes are in China's future.  The aforementioned philosophical debates suggest the necessity for a governmental system that is in line with Confucian beliefs. Many view liberal democracy as unfit for modern China and its traditions of legalism and Confucianism.

Pan Wei  addresses these issues and promotes a system of governance that is more appropriate for a Confucian society.  He blends aspects of democracy, like governmental responsiveness to the will of the people, with Confucian values like social harmony.  The proposed Consultative Rule of Law supersedes individual interest groups and promotes the good of the people at large. Pan's system also directly addresses China's most crippling shortcomings, most notably corruption.  Identified as the largest problem in China's current government, corruption among officials is directly tied to the institutional structure of the PRC. An institutional shift to consultative rule of law would serve to alleviate corruption and evolve from authoritarianism, all while promoting the traditional values of a Confucian society.

Influence of international events 
The election of Donald Trump as President of the United States reinforced Chinese views that liberal democracy is dysfunctional. The United States' response to the COVID-19 pandemic compounded the situation, increasing views among the Chinese public that the United States political system and economy were not world benchmarks.

See also
 Asian values

References

Further reading

Chinese democracy movements
Democracy
Politics of China
Skepticism